The Royal Palace of Ugarit was the royal residence of the rulers of the ancient kingdom of Ugarit on the Mediterranean coast of Syria. The palace was excavated with the rest of the city from the 1930s by French archaeologist Claude F. A. Schaeffer and is considered one of the most important finds made at Ugarit.

Overview

Layout
The palace area was surrounded by a fortified wall that dates back to the 15th-century BC.

The palace consisted of ninety rooms divided between two floors. The rooms were built around four large courtyards and four smaller ones. The western end of the palace had a large garden. In the north side of the palace, three underground burial chambers were constructed. The ground floor was used for administrative purposes and included offices, archives, storage and staff dwellings. The second floor housed the family quarters, and was accessed through twelve staircases. The palace had three entrances: the main gate on the northwest near the Fortress, and two smaller entrances in the northeast and the southwest.

Architecture
The palace was built in four major stages between the 15th and 13th-century BC. It was built out of ashlar stone blocks and wooden crossbeams, with a thick coat of plain plaster covering the walls. The fortified wall, which dates back to the 15th-century BC, was built with packed stones at the bottom and had an outward slope of 45 degrees.

The layout is typical of palaces of the Eastern Mediterranean and the Ancient Near East. The irregular outline of the palace and the asymmetrical layout are evidence of constant additions and alterations. The burial chambers had corbelled vaults which show a connection with Hittite and Mycenaean architecture.

Excavation

After the chance discovery of Ugarit by local peasants in 1929, French archaeologist, Claude F. A. Schaeffer led ten excavation campaigns at the site which only covered the northwest corner. Excavations stopped with the advent of World War II and only resumed in 1948. Between 1950 and 1955 Schaeffer led concentrated excavations at the palace which unearthed a vast corpus of tablets and artefacts.

Artifacts
Objects found at the site included ivory carvings, furniture, stone stelae, and figurines. An Egyptian-made alabaster vase was found, partially damaged. The ornamentation on the vase depicts the wedding of Ugarit King Niqmaddu II to an upper-class Egyptian woman. Other vases of Egyptian origin found at the site include ones carrying the cartouches of Egyptian Kings Ramesses II and Horemheb.

Tablets
Eight archives of cuneiform tablets were excavated in the palace complex. The corpus included more than a 1,000 tablets written mostly in Akkadian and Ugaritic. A small corpus of Hurrian and Hittite tablets were discovered as well. The tablets were organized by subject in different wings. They included administrative reports about Ugarit's dependencies, judicial records, official correspondence with other rulers and even practice tablets that new scribes used to learn writing. The tablets included about 36 hymns, known as the Hurrian songs.

References

Citations

Bibliography

Buildings and structures completed in the 15th century BC
Ugarit
Ugarit
Ancient Near East buildings and structures
Buildings and structures in Latakia Governorate